The Xiu Xiu / The Dead Science split 7-inch, released in 2005 on Deathbomb Arc, is one of several split EPs by both Xiu Xiu and The Dead Science. Eugene Robinson (of Oxbow) contributed vocals for Xiu Xiu's track, and The Dead Science track has posthumous vocals by outsider artist Shooby Taylor.

Track listing
 Xiu Xiu - "Juarez"
 The Dead Science - "The Human Horn"

External links
 MP3 clip of "The Human Horn" (from record label site)
 Deathbomb Arc (record label)

Xiu Xiu albums
The Dead Science albums
2005 EPs
Split albums